The Dry River is an intermittent tributary,  long, of the Crooked River in the U.S. state of Oregon. The stream arises near Hampton Buttes north of Hampton and U.S. Route 20 between Brothers and Riley in the Oregon High Desert. Beginning in eastern Deschutes County near its border with Crook County, it flows generally northwest along the Deschutes–Crook county line, crossing briefly into Crook County before turning slightly south and returning to Deschutes County. Continuing north and re-entering Crook County, it passes under Powell Butte Highway, Oregon Route 126 (Ochoco Highway), and Oregon Route 370 (O'Neil Highway) before entering the Crooked River  from the larger stream's confluence with the Deschutes River.

The canyon was carved during the wetter climate of the Pleistocene epoch by water flowing from a now-vanished lake in the Millican Valley. Other sights include large boulders, juniper trees, and Native American petroglyphs.

See also 
 List of rivers of Oregon
 List of longest streams of Oregon

References

Rivers of Oregon
Rivers of Crook County, Oregon
Rivers of Deschutes County, Oregon